As of 2023, there are no officially recognised flags for the individual states or union territories of India. No legal prohibitions to prevent states adopting distinctive flags exist in either the Emblems and Names (Prevention of Improper Use) Act, 1950, or the Prevention of Insults to National Honour Act, 1971. In a 1994 case before the Supreme Court of India, S. R. Bommai v. Union of India, the Supreme Court declared that there is no prohibition in the Constitution of India for a state to have its own flag. However, a state flag should not dishonour the national flag. The Flag code of India also permits other flags to be flown with the Flag of India, but not on the same flag pole or in a superior position to the national flag.

Former official state flags 
The state of Jammu and Kashmir had an officially recognised state flag between 1952 and 2019 under the special status granted to the state by Article 370 of the Constitution of India.

Proposed state flags
The Government of Tamil Nadu proposed a design for the Flag of Tamil Nadu in 1970.

The Government of Karnataka proposed a design for the Flag of Karnataka in 2018 based on the traditional yellow-red Kannada bicolour. The new tricolour flag with the central white band and emblem, was designed to distance itself from regional political parties and emulate the structure of the Indian Tricolour. In August 2019, the Government of Karnataka announced it was no longer officially pursuing the proposal for an official state flag.

Banners of the states and union territories
When a distinctive banner is required to represent a state or union territory, the emblem of the state or union territory is usually displayed on a white field.

States

Union territories

See also
National Flag of India
Flag code of India
List of Indian flags
List of Indian state symbols
List of Indian state emblems
 List of Indian state mottos
List of Indian state songs
List of Indian state foundation days
List of Indian state animals
List of Indian state birds
List of Indian state flowers
List of Indian state trees

References

Indian states
 
Flags,state
Flags
India